The Thacker Pass Lithium Mine is a lithium clay mining development project in Humboldt County, Nevada which is the largest known lithium deposit in the US, and one of the largest in the world. There has been significant exploration of Thacker Pass since 2007. The Bureau of Land Management issued a Record of Decision approving development of the mine in January, 2021. Construction began in March 2023 after an emergency appeal was denied by the court. The mine is a project of Lithium Nevada, LLC - a wholly owned subsidiary of Lithium Americas Corp, whose largest shareholder is the world's largest lithium mining company, Chinese Ganfeng Lithium. At full capacity it would produce 66,000 tons annually, equivalent to 25% of the current (2021) demand for lithium globally, which is expected to triple over the next five years. Development of the mine is driven by increasing demand for lithium used in electric vehicle batteries and grid storage of intermittently generated electricity from sources such as solar power or wind power. In late January 2023, car giant General Motors announced it would invest $650M in the mine project, giving GM exclusive access to the first phase of production. 

The project has met resistance in the form of legal challenges and direct action. Several indigenous tribes with traditional homeland in the area oppose the project. These tribes have stated that Thacker Pass is a sacred site, a massacre site, and that they were not adequately consulted by the Bureau of Land Management. Opponents of the mine have voiced concerns about rushed environmental review, threats to critical wildlife habitat, disruption of cultural sites, and links between resource extraction and missing and murdered indigenous women. Proponents of the mine have stated that the project is necessary to limit climate change by reducing carbon emissions from American cars, is benign in its social and environmental impact, and will create 300 long-term jobs in rural Nevada, paying an average of $63,000 per year. The New York Times reported that controversy around the mine is "emblematic of a fundamental tension" between green energy and damages caused by resource extraction required for those technologies.

Resources
The Thacker Pass lithium deposit has Measured and Indicated Resources of 13.7 million tonnes of lithium carbonate equivalent, at an average ore grade of 2,231 ppm (0.22%) lithium. The Thacker Pass volcano-sedimentary deposit is the largest known sedimentary lithium resource in the U.S. 

Lithium Americas estimates that the site contains recoverable lithium worth $3.9 billion. It is estimated that enough for batteries for about a million electric vehicles a year could be mined.

Mining and extraction process 
Thacker Pass would use a newly-developed process to extract lithium from the clay deposit. Usually lithium is mined by either hard rock mining or brine mining. This mine will use hydraulic shovels to remove the clay and turn it into a slurry.  Non-lithium-containing sand and rock will be separated and immediately returned to the pit.The lithium-bearing clay slurry would be mixed with sulfuric acid to extract the metal. A plant would be built on-site to burn molten sulfur and produce sulfuric acid, which is safer than transporting sulfuric acid, and would result in one third the number of truckloads necessary. Sulfur is a byproduct from oil refineries, and may be sourced from as far away as the Aberta oil sands. The facility would produce 5,800 tons of sulfuric acid per day, requiring 75 semi-trucks of molten sulfur to be delivered daily from Winnemucca. Burning the sulfur to produce sulfuric acid is an exothermic reaction, allowing the plant to generate most of its own electricity.

After the slurry is reacted with sulfuric acid, it will be pressed through filters which separate the elemental lithium solution, and then processed into lithium carbonate or lithium hydroxide for batteries.  The tailings will then be returned to the pit. (The mine will use a process called "block mining", whereby previously excavated sections get filled with tailings as the operation progresses.)

The mine is planned to operate for 46 years, with the first 20 years removing material above the water table, with Lithium Americas intending to do studies over a decade on the water flows around the pit in hopes of proposing a safe method for mining below the water table (for which they are not yet permitted to do.)

Background

Global demand and US deposits 
Development of the mine is driven by increasing demand for lithium used in electric vehicle batteries and for grid storage of intermittently generated electricity from sources such as solar power or wind power. As of 2021 lithium demand is expected to triple over the next 5 years, increase tenfold by 2030, and potentially increase 50-fold by 2040. The US government is concerned that, as of 2021, almost all the lithium used in the US is imported, which the Department of Energy says is a "strategic vulnerability". The Biden administration policy sees the United States securing a larger share of the lithium-battery supply chain through “safe, equitable and sustainable domestic mining ventures”.

While the US holds some of the largest known reserves of lithium, the only large-scale US mine producing it (located in Silver Peak, Nevada) makes less than 5,000 tons annually, which is less than 2% of the global supply. Bessemer City mine and Kings Mountain Mine in North Carolina have a lithium deposits. 

The environmental conflict at Thacker Pass lithium mine is representative of global conflicts arising from increased mineral extraction that would be required to make an energy transition away from fossil fuels in response to climate change. Indigenous people have expressed concern that a global rush for critical minerals like lithium, nickel, cobalt, and copper could violate their basic rights and endanger their local ecologies and cultural heritage. International frontline communities affected by mining have called for a just transition that would prevent or minimise this damage to Indigenous cultures and the environment.

Cultural history 
Thacker Pass is the traditional homeland of several related Indigenous nations, including the Shoshone-Paiute Tribes of the Duck Valley Reservation, the Fort McDermitt Paiute and Shoshone Tribe, Lovelock Paiute Tribe, Fallon Paiute Shoshone Tribe, Pyramid Lake Paiute Tribe and the Reno-Sparks Indian Colony. Local Indigenous communities harvest traditional foods, medicines and supplies for sacred ceremonies in the region. Members of the Fort McDermitt Paiute and Shoshone Tribe have stated that their tribe, "descends from essentially two families who, hiding in Thacker Pass, managed to avoid being sent to reservations farther away from our ancestral lands" and hence that this tribe owes its existence to the shelter provided by the Pass.

Thacker Pass is called Peehee mu'huh in the Paiute language, meaning 'rotten moon'. This name derives from an 1865 massacre that Native tribes contend occurred at Thacker Pass (though the BLM contends that the site is 15 miles away), where a band of Paiute families were killed.

Mine impacts 
CO2 emissions from the mine would amount to over 152,000 tons annually, (equal to a small city).

The mine would consume 1.7 billion gallons of water annually (500,000 gallons per ton of lithium produced). The mine's water use prompted a lawsuit from a local rancher who claimed that the hydrologist hired by the BLM to prepare reports assessing the mine's impact had a conflict of interest with Lithium Nevada.

The project may be disruptive to the habitat of Endangered Species Act-listed animals. A coalition of environmental groups filing a lawsuit against the mine stated that Thacker Pass is, "critically important to wildlife because it connects the Double H Mountains to the Montana Mountains. The pass also provides lower-elevation habitat that wildlife need to survive the winter." The group also stated that the area constituted, "one of the last big blocks of the sagebrush sea free of development."

Additional environmental concerns include contamination from groundwater pollutants such as arsenic, air pollution from sulfuric acid leaching of lithium from clay sediments, and changes in the connectivity of groundwater and surface water systems. This could harm the habitat of the endangered Lahontan cutthroat trout and the Kings River pyrg (Pyrgulopsis imperialis), a rare springsnail not known to live anywhere else in the world.

There are concerns about the mine's potential impacts on the safety of local communities: projects that bring a large predominately male workforce from outside the local area can generate local increases in drug use and violent crime, and are associated with violence against Indigenous women.

Regulatory approval and litigation

Bureau of Land Management
In August 2019, Lithium Americas lodged a Plan of Operations for its proposed lithium clay mining development project with the Bureau of Land Management (BLM), the federal mining regulator. In January 2020, the company announced the publication of a Notice of Intent to prepare an Environmental Impact Statement for the Thacker Pass lithium project. On January 15, 2021, BLM issued their Record of Decision approving the Thacker Pass Lithium Mine.

Opponents of the mine claim the environmental review was rushed, because what is normally a multi-year review process was completed in less than a year. During the permitting process for the proposed Thacker Pass lithium mine in 2020, the BLM consultation with the Fort McDermitt Paiute and Shoshone Tribe, the Summit Lake Paiute tribe, and the Western Winnemucca Indian Colony resulted in no issue concerning historic property within areas of potential disturbance. Other tribes were not consulted  during the review process, leading the Burns Paiute Tribe and the Reno-Sparks Indian Colony to intervene in a lawsuit against the BLM and Lithium Nevada Corporation in July 2021.

In early February, 2021, a local rancher filed a lawsuit against the BLM over concerns about the project's water use. On February 26, 2021, four environmental non-profits (Western Watersheds Project, Great Basin Resource Watch, Basin and Range Watch, and Wildlands Defense) also filed a lawsuit challenging the BLM's permitting of the project, claiming threats to sage grouse habitat, old growth sagebrush, golden eagle nests, endemic springsnails, and Endangered Species Act–listed Lahontan cutthroat trout, bighorn sheep, and pygmy rabbits. These opponents of the mine have claimed that the review process was rushed and that the public input process was questionable.

Regional indigenous tribes have intervened in the lawsuits against the BLM and Lithium Nevada Corporation. Reno-Sparks Indian Colony requested that the BLM consult them about the mine, stating in a letter that, "Just because regional tribes have been isolated and forced onto reservations relatively far away from Thacker Pass does not mean these regional tribes do not possess cultural connections to the Pass." When the BLM rejected this request for consultation, Reno Sparks Indian Colony, Burns Paiute Tribe, and a committee of Fort McDermitt Tribal members calling themselves People of Red Mountain intervened in the lawsuits. People of Red Mountain is not a federally recognized tribe so it has no legal standing. The tribes are demanding consultation under the Archaeological Resource Protection Act. 

The Fort McDermitt Tribal Council initially had a project engagement agreement with Lithium Americas but the council withdrew from that agreement and agreed to sue the Bureau of Land Management for violations of the National Historic Preservation Act after a petition organised by the People of Red Mountain. This lawsuit was never filed. 

In July, 2021 Chief United States District Judge, Miranda Du ruled that Lithium America may excavate archaeological trenches at the site, as the environmental groups could not show irreparable harm would be caused by the digging. The digging will be less than 1/4 acre and will be used to determine whether cultural artifacts exist within the proposed project area. 

In September, the judge also ruled against tribes' claims that a historical massacre occurred in Thacker Pass and refused to grant their request for a preliminary injunction to stop excavation for cultural resources. She stated that while she found their spiritual distress persuasive, they did not show sufficiently specific irreparable harm. She also stated that, "the evidence before the Court does not support [plaintiffs'] claims...the 1868 field notes do not show a massacre happened within the Project area."

On October 5, 2021, Tribal lawyers filed a motion asking the judge to reconsider the opinion that the massacre did not occur at Thacker Pass. This motion was denied on November 8, and the judge stated: "the proffered newly discovered evidence is too speculative to support an irreparable harm finding".

The Archeological Resources Protection permit, issued in September 2021, required additional approval and on December 16, 2021, the Bureau of Land Management signed off on the final Field Work Authorization allowing excavation work to proceed in Thacker Pass. 
On December 17th, 2021 a letter was delivered to the People of Red Mountain notifying the group that Falk, and co-counsel Terry Lodge, planned on filing a motion to withdraw as attorneys on January 7, 2022 citing irreconcilable differences.
On January 3, 2022, the Reno-Sparks Indian Colony; the remaining tribe represented in the lawsuit by Falk and Lodge, applied, alongside the Burns Paiute Tribe, to the 9th Circuit Court of Appeals for reconsideration of previous preliminary injunction requests that would have prevented the now fully permitted digging from going ahead. The stay pending the appeal was denied by Chief Judge Miranda Du of the District Court of Nevada on January 12, 2022.

On January 26, 2022, Falk along with co-counsel Terry Lodge and local counsel, Julie Cavanaugh-Bill, were formally granted withdrawal as attorneys for the People of Red Mountain. Cavanaugh-Bill also withdrew from representing the Reno Sparks Indian Colony.
The next day, an article describing the acrimonious split, stated that the People of Red Mountain fired Falk because Falk and Wilbert, co-founders of 'Protect Thacker Pass', are also members of Deep Green Resistance (DGR), and there were concerns over DGR's beliefs about transgenderism. Further articles followed on the rift. 

On February 11, 2022, the  Winnemucca Indian Colony filed a motion to intervene in the lawsuits, claiming lack of consultation prior to the January 15, 2021 Record of Decision. The BLM's communications to the local tribes, including the Winnemucca Indian Colony began in 2019 according to court filings. The  has been the center of a decades-long fight concerning its council's legitimacy, tribal membership eligibility disputes and legal cases involving the Bureau of Indian Affairs, the tribal council and colony residents.

On March 11, 2022 the District Court of Nevada denied the Winnemucca Indian Colony's motion to intervene in the lawsuits. Chief U.S. District Judge, Miranda Du, ruled that the motion was untimely, predjudicial to other parties and that Winnemucca Indian Colony should have acted much sooner if they believed their interests might be adversely affected.
 
In March 2022, a  Magistrate Judge ordered that if People of Red Mountain failed to obtain counsel by May 2, 2022, the court will recommend that their claims be dismissed. No new counsel had appeared before the court by that date, resulting in a  Magistrate Judge issuing a Report and Recommendation to dismiss the group's claims without prejudice.

On April 4, 2022 the Reno-Sparks Indian Colony and Burns Paiute Tribe’s dropped their appeal to the United States Ninth Circuit for reconsideration of previous preliminary injunction requests.

In October 2022, the Fort McDermitt Paiute and Shoshone Tribe signed a Community Benefits Agreement (CBA) with Lithium Americas establishing a collaborative framework and defining the long-term benefits for the tribe.

Nevada state environmental permits
On February 25, 2022, the Nevada Division of Environmental Protection (NDEP) issued three permits for the Thacker Pass lithium mine. 
 Air Pollution Control Permit. 
 Water Pollution Control Permit.
 Mining Reclamation Permit.

Lithium Americas stated that these were the final state-level permits necessary for the project.
On June 28, 2022, the SEC five-member panel voted to affirm NDEP's approval of the Water Pollution Control Permit.

Federal eagle take permit
On March 8, 2022, the U.S. Fish and Wildlife Service published its Record of Decision, for Lithium Nevada Corporation's (LNC) Eagle Take Permit Application and Eagle Conservation Plan.
The  Final Environmental Impact Statement (FEIS) found three occupied golden eagle territories overlapping the project area and a fourth closely adjoining it. 
No eagle nests were found within the Thacker Pass mine project area, and the USFWS intend to issue an eagle incidental take permit to LNC relating to noise disturbance in a territory encompassing Thacker Canyon.

Protests
Two members of Deep Green Resistance (DGR), a radical environmental group, began occupying Thacker Pass on January 15, 2021, the day the Record of Decision was issued for the proposed mine.
Max Wilbert and attorney Will Falk set up the 'Protect Thacker Pass' camp, supported by DGR funding, to oppose construction of the lithium mine. 

Mine opponents have concerns about the lack of free, prior, and informed indigenous consent for the project; destruction of sacred sites and hunting and gathering areas; and greenwashing of the project.

On April 10, 2021, over 60 people from different reservations in the region came to Thacker Pass to demonstrate their opposition to the mine by praying, dancing, and sharing food with local people and protesters occupying the site. Indigenous people attending that event said there were sacred sites in the area including burials and also a massacre site from which the location derives its name in the Paiute language. They also demonstrated concerns about public health, water quality, air quality, and lack of indigenous consent for the project.

On June 12, 2021, hundreds of people attended a rally in Reno, Nevada to protest the Thacker Pass lithium mine.

In January 2022, Gary McKinney, a spokesperson for the People of Red Mountain, said they had recently removed their protest camp from Thacker Pass and split from joint opposition with Falk and Wilbert over concerns regarding their links to Deep Green Resistance (DGR). 
Ian Bigley, Mining Justice Organizer for the Progressive Leadership Alliance(PLAN) of Nevada, who visited the 'Protect Thacker Pass' camp, said that he felt misled regarding its ties with DGR, and that the association was hindering donations opposing the mine.
Kelly Fuller, then Energy and Mining Campaign Director for the Western Watersheds Project, one of the environmental groups suing the BLM over the project, also commented on the cost of having DGR involved.    
Wilbert and Falk took down their protest camp after the BLM fined the two men for trespassing and digging latrines at the site in September 2021.

Responses 
The New York Times reported that, "the fight over the Nevada mine is emblematic of a fundamental tension surfacing around the world: Electric cars and renewable energy may not be as green as they appear".

In May, 2021, a group of Fort McDermitt Paiute-Shoshone tribal members, calling themselves People of Red Mountain, petitioned the United States Department of the Interior and others to halt construction of the lithium mine at Thacker Pass. Their petition states that Thacker Pass is a massacre site, contains ancestral burials, is sacred to their people, and is "essential to the survival of our traditions."

In an opinion piece for a local newspaper, protest organizer Max Wilbert has cited research linking large infrastructure projects such as mines with violence against Indigenous women, and pointed to recent cases of sexual violence at the Enbridge Line 3 pipeline where contractors were arrested in a sex trafficking sting.

In October, 2022 the Western Mining Action Network organised an international conference in Reno, NV in which international frontline communities affected by mining called for a just transition to renewable energy that would not threaten Indigenous cultures and the environment and voiced concerns about the development of Thacker Pass lithium mine.

In an opinion piece in a local newspaper, Lithium America's CEO Alexi Zawadzki criticized the protests and reassured concerns about environmental impact. He argued that development of the Thacker Pass lithium deposit would support President Biden's economic security goals, provide jobs, and help the U.S. reach greenhouse gas emission targets. According to reporting in local news, Zawadzki and the company remained in active communication with the Fort McDermitt Paiute and Shoshone tribe, and several dozen tribal members had applied for jobs at the mine.

In an opinion piece in a local newspaper, Glenn C. Miller, Professor Emeritus of the Department of Natural Resources and Environmental Science, University of Nevada Reno wrote "The proposed Thacker Pass mine will be relatively benign in comparison to other large mines in Nevada, primarily gold and copper mines." Miller also stated that no mining below the groundwater level will occur for the first 20 years, though later mining may go below that level. Miller states that there should be an on-going discussion about how the project would change the character of the valley. Miller closes with "The Thacker Pass mine is an important mitigation measure to slowing the U.S. contribution to climate change."

Max Wilbert, an environmental organizer and protester stated: "A lot of us understand blowing up a mountain for coal mining is wrong; I think blowing up a mountain for lithium mining is just as wrong," and "Electric cars won't actually reduce greenhouse gas emissions that much; they will reduce emissions but not by a sizable amount." However the reporters noted that nearly 30% of US greenhouse gas emissions come from the transportation sector.

Glenn Miller, a retired environmental professor from the University of Nevada Reno stated that it is a "relatively benign mine for its size." and "Those who say it isn't going to make any difference, they're simply wrong," Miller said. "Radical environmentalists are going to argue that the only way to solve the climate change problem is to drive a whole lot less and to not burn gasoline or coal. Well, that's not going to happen -- the demands of society are set so we're going to have to have an active transportation industry."

The CEO of Lithium Americas said that the most important reason to build mines in the US isn't for the direct mining jobs, but rather to create the domestic supply chain security that thereby enables large numbers of US jobs in battery factories.

References

External links 
https://www.marketplace.org/shows/how-we-survive/white-gold/

Lithium mines in the United States
Mineral exploration
Geography of Humboldt County, Nevada
Mining in Nevada
Proposed infrastructure in the United States
Environment of Nevada
Environmental protests in the United States
2021 protests
Indigenous rights in the United States
Indigenous land rights
Environmental controversies
Nonviolent occupation